General Education in a Free Society, also known as the Harvard Redbook, is a 1945 Harvard University report on the importance of general education in American secondary and post-secondary schools. It is among the most important works in curriculum studies.

In the words of education historian Frederick Rudolph, the Redbook called for "a submersion in tradition and heritage and some sense of common bond string enough to bring unbridled ego and ambition under control."

References

References

External links 

 Full text (online) at Internet Archive
 Full text (PDF) at Internet Archive

1946 non-fiction books
Books about education
English-language books
Harvard University Press books